Perseus "Percy" Jackson is a fictional character, the title character and narrator of Rick Riordan's Percy Jackson & the Olympians series. He is also one of seven main protagonists of the sequel series The Heroes of Olympus, appearing in every book except The Lost Hero, and appears in the Trials of Apollo series, making him one of the few characters to appear in all three series of the Camp Half-Blood chronicles. He has also been a narrator and protagonist in Riordan's Greco-Roman/Egyptian crossover stories, part of the Demigods and Magicians collection. The character serves as the narrator in Percy Jackson's Greek Gods and Percy Jackson's Greek Heroes, also by Rick Riordan.

Percy Jackson is played by Logan Lerman in the film adaptations and by Chris McCarrell in the musical. Walker Scobell is set to portray the character in the upcoming TV adaptation for Disney+.

Creation and conception
Development of the character Percy Jackson began when Rick Riordan started inventing stories for his son Haley Riordan, who was diagnosed with ADHD and dyslexia in the spring of 2002. When Haley was in second grade and he was studying Greek mythology, he asked his father to tell him bedtime stories based on those myths. When his father ran out of ideas, Haley suggested that he make up new stories that combined existing mythological characters with new ones. This led Riordan to create the fictional character of Percy Jackson and the story of his travels across the United States to recover Zeus's lightning-bolt. Haley then suggested it be written as a novel. Riordan received input on the manuscript from some of his middle school students before taking the idea of Percy Jackson to a publisher.

Riordan has said that Percy Jackson's original character was "inspired by my son's own struggle" at school. Haley and Percy have been cited as the "same age" and share several character traits, though they are by no means the same person. Riordan has also stated that Percy has "[his] sense of humor" and is also "based on many of the students [he has] had in the past."

Character
In the story, Percy Jackson is portrayed as a demigod, the son of the mortal Sally Jackson and the Greek god Poseidon. He has ADHD and dyslexia, allegedly because he is hardwired to read Ancient Greek and has inborn "battlefield reflexes". Percy's birthday is August 18. In the first novel of the series, The Lightning Thief, he is twelve years old.

His personality is described as "changeable like the sea" and hard to predict — with the important exception that he is dangerously loyal to his friends and family. The goddess Athena describes this as his fatal flaw. Percy's "powers", which start small and develop as the books proceed, include controlling water, making hurricanes, breathing underwater, and talking to horse-like animals and fish. He also becomes an accomplished sword-fighter and leader. Throughout Percy Jackson & the Olympians, Percy grows more confident and brave. He serves as the first head counselor of the Poseidon cabin at his demigod summer camp – Camp Half-Blood.

After The Last Olympian, the next time Percy is seen is in The Son of Neptune, the second book in the sequel series The Heroes of Olympus. He has amnesia and slowly struggles to regain his memory over the course of the novel. For a while in the book he cannot remember anything other than Annabeth Chase, his long-time friend. He arrives at a Roman establishment called Camp Jupiter, and is elected praetor as a result of the help he offers them on a quest. During the remaining three books in the third person his character develops significantly. He develops an irrational fear of drowning; is humbled by weakening sword-fighting skills; and expresses a new tendency to make ambiguous moral choices in defense of his friends and family. One of the character's darkest moments comes in The House of Hades, when Percy discovers that he can control the water in a person's body, and uses it to torture the goddess Akhlys. Percy's girlfriend Annabeth Chase is present and brings him to his senses, but remains haunted by his readiness to use that new power.

At the end of The Blood of Olympus, Percy and Annabeth reveal plans to finish their senior year of high school together in New York, and then attend college in New Rome (a demigod-only city located in California, guarded by Camp Jupiter). In The Hidden Oracle, Percy has been accepted to the college with a full scholarship, provided he can pass his SATs and graduate on time despite the semester he spent away (while missing during The Lost Hero). Percy's concern for his future and family leads him to uncharacteristically turn down Lester Papadopoulous's request for help on a quest to regain his godhood (Papadopoulous being the mortal form of the god Apollo).

Friends and family

Family
Percy is the son of Poseidon; his mother, Sally Jackson, married a man named Gabe Ugliano when Percy was young. Ugliano was abusive towards Percy and Sally, the latter of whom leaves him in The Lightning Thief. It is later known that Sally married Ugliano as the latter was so mortal and human and gave off such a stench that no monster would roam anywhere near his surroundings. As Percy was a strong demigod (a son of Poseidon, one of the "Big Three") and such demigods attract monsters more than usual, she had to marry him to protect Percy from danger.

Between the time of The Battle of the Labyrinth and The Last Olympian, Sally marries Paul Blofis, a man she met in a writing seminar. Percy likes and respects his new step-father and eventually reveals to him that he is a demigod. Though understandably shocked, Blofis still stays with the Jackson family and accepts Percy's complicated life. In The Hidden Oracle, Sally is seven months pregnant with Paul's child, and later gives birth to Estelle in The Tower of Nero, making her Percy's half-sister.

Percy has a half-brother named Tyson, who is a cyclops. Though Percy is related to virtually every character and creature in Greek mythology through his father Poseidon, Tyson is one of the only beings whom he acknowledges as family. Percy first met Tyson at a school called Meriwether Prep, and did not learn of their relationship until much later. Percy is also distantly related to horses, pegasi, some other monsters, and numerous gods and demigods through his father. Significant examples of this would be that he is technically a grandson of Kronos, nephew to Hades, Zeus, and numerous other Olympians, as well as the half-nephew of Chiron.

Friends
Percy's oldest friend is Grover Underwood, a satyr originally tasked with protecting him and bringing him safely to Camp Half-Blood. His next-oldest friend is Annabeth Chase, whom he meets when she helps nurse him back to health after his first fight with the Minotaur. The two accompany him on his first, and most of his subsequent, quests.

Percy is also close to many other characters in the book series. His closest friends include Thalia Grace, daughter of Zeus and leader of the Hunters of Artemis; Luke Castellan, son of Hermes (at first Percy's friend, then his enemy, and finally Percy's friend at the time of his death); Nico di Angelo, son of Hades; Rachel Elizabeth Dare, a mortal Pythia, or host of a prophetic spirit; Hazel Levesque, daughter of Pluto; Leo Valdez, son of Hephaestus; Jason Grace, son of Jupiter; Piper McLean, daughter of Aphrodite; and Frank Zhang, son of Mars. Frank Zhang is also a descendant of Periclymenus, descendant of Poseidon, and so distantly related to Percy. Percy also has a unique relationship with Clarisse La Rue, daughter of Ares and Camp Half-Blood's resident bully, whom he allegedly dislikes but often helps.

Romantic relationships
Percy's oldest romantic relationship is with Annabeth Chase. Their relationship gradually changes throughout the first series, with the goddess Aphrodite first insinuating that it was romantic in The Titan's Curse, when Percy undertakes a quest to free Annabeth from the Titan Atlas. However, Percy's first move towards a serious relationship does not occur until the final pages of The Last Olympian.

Other romantic relationships are shown to have been possibilities before this however. As the final battle with the Titans approaches after The Battle of the Labyrinth, Percy spends time with his mortal friend Rachel Dare. Their relationship causes Chase to become jealous and helps enact the events of The Last Olympian. Towards the end of the book, Rachel realizes that her attraction is not to Percy, but to the mythological world he is in, because of her destiny as the next Oracle of Delphi.

Three other characters in the novels are romantically interested in Percy, though he remains mostly oblivious. Nico di Angelo's hero worship of Percy turns into an ever-worsening crush on him; at the same time, Nico resents Percy because he believes that Percy had allowed his sister Bianca to die in battle. The second is Calypso, who was banished to the island of Ogygia. The third is Reyna Ramírez-Arellano, who, while is silently attracted to her comrade Jason Grace, finds herself attracted to many of Percy's similar traits.

Magical animal companions
Percy has several animal companions. The first is Blackjack, a black pegasus that Percy liberates from the Princess Andromeda in The Sea of Monsters. Blackjack is referred to as a "mare" in The Sea of Monsters, but is called a stallion in all later books. Blackjack becomes Percy's personal steed and companion. Blackjack is unfailingly loyal to Percy, and on several occasions manages to save Percy's life. Blackjack always calls Percy "boss" and is quite fond of sugar cubes and doughnuts.

Percy's second magical companion is Mrs. O'Leary, who is introduced in the fourth novel, Battle of the Labyrinth. She is a hellhound whom he receives from Daedalus before the inventor dies. Though Mrs. O'Leary is described as "the size of a tank", the magical veil known as the Mist causes her to appear as a poodle to mortals. Percy often refers to her as "his dog". Percy sometimes uses Mrs. O'Leary's ability to "shadow travel" to cross large distances almost instantaneously. His brother Tyson and friend Charles Beckendorf are Mrs. O'Leary's other caretakers, though she is also fond of Nico di Angelo.

Percy also knows a hippocampus named Rainbow, who likes Tyson. It first appears in The Sea of Monsters, where it helps Percy and his friends enter Luke Castellan's boat Princess Andromeda. It later saves Tyson's life and returns to help the two brothers on several occasions.

Percy has also traveled with a small calico kitten called Small Bob by Bob the Titan. Small Bob was accidentally created by one of Atlas's servants who was attempting to summon a group of spartoi. When Percy is trapped in Tartarus during The House of Hades, Annabeth, Bob, and he find and travel with the kitten. He is fond of Bob and protective of the traveling group, leading Bob to call him "a good monster". Small Bob can transform into a full sized saber-toothed tiger at will and occasionally appears as a skeleton for a few seconds at a time. His purr is disproportionately loud for an animal of his size. Small Bob remains in Tartarus with Iapetus to help hold open the Doors of Death. It is unclear if he lives or dies, but he is not mentioned again.

Description
Percy is described as handsome, with messy jet black hair, a Mediterranean complexion, and sea-green eyes like his father Poseidon. His mother notes that Percy looked just like his father, and his friend Hazel says that he has the looks of a Roman god.

Abilities
Like most demigods, Percy has ADHD and dyslexia, the former because of his godly battle instincts, and the latter because his brain takes more naturally to Ancient Greek than to English. After being trained at Camp Half-Blood, he has developed a Greek fighting style (described as unpredictable by New Romans) and is an expert swordsman. After bathing in the River Styx, Percy was given the curse of Achilles, making him invulnerable except for the small of his back. He loses this power when it is washed away in the Little Tiber surrounding New Rome, as part of his acceptance there. In addition, he has an "empathy link" with his first friend from Camp Half-Blood, Grover.

As a son of Poseidon, one of the "Big Three" (the others being Zeus and Hades), Percy is more powerful than most of the gods' other children. He also has a degree of authority over his father's subjects. Percy is gifted with several semi-divine abilities: the ability to manipulate water and currents; enhanced strength/energy and senses while near the water; the ability to breathe underwater; the ability to operate old sailing ships with his mind; mental communication with marine animals, equine animals, water nymphs, and some of his relatives; and the creation of small earthquakes and hurricanes. All of Percy's abilities correspond to the myths about and abilities of his father.

Weapons
Percy's main weapon is Anaklusmos ("Riptide"), a sword made of celestial bronze given to him by Chiron the centaur, on the instructions of Poseidon; the sword's history goes back to Heracles, who was gifted that sword by the nymph Zoë Nightshade, a daughter of Atlas. Riptide can change shape; when it is not a sword, it appears as a ballpoint pen engraved with its name. It reappears in the character's pocket when lost. Since it is made of celestial bronze it will harm gods, demigods, and monsters, but simply passes through mortals. Percy has also used magic javelins made by his brother Tyson, magically camouflaging armor made by Charles Beckendorf, and the wand of Carter Kane. In The Sea of Monsters, his half-brother Tyson gives him a wristwatch that changes into a shield covered with designs, but the watch is damaged in The Titan's Curse and lost in The Battle of the Labyrinth.

Percy has several magical items obtained from battles against monsters. The first of these is the horn of the Minotaur, which he obtains after killing the beast on Half-Blood Hill. Another is the head of Medusa, which he cuts off after killing the gorgon. He gives the head away several times, finally leaving it with his mother, who "disposes of it". He also obtains a bullet- and sword-proof lion skin coat when he killed the Nemean lion, which he later sacrifices as an offering to Poseidon in order to save Annabeth.

See also
From the Files of the Time Rangers – also depicting Greek gods active in present-day America

References

Camp Half-Blood Chronicles characters
Child characters in literature
Literary characters introduced in 2005
Fictional characters with water abilities
Characters in American novels of the 21st century
Fictional characters from New York (state)
Fictional swordfighters
Fictional characters with dyslexia
Fictional demigods
Male characters in literature
Teenage characters in literature
Fictional characters from New York City
Fictional characters with attention deficit hyperactivity disorder